The Saburtalo Line is a line of the Tbilisi Metro in Georgia. The line was first opened in 1979 and has since extended to western residential districts of the city, near Tbilisi State University’s X and XI buildings.

History

Name changes

Transfers

Rolling stock
The line is served by the Nadzaladevi (No.1) depot. currently 9 four carriage trains are assigned to it. All are the 81-714/717 versions with .5 and .5M modifications

Recent developments and future plans
The line is extending to the west and some of the construction sites that have been derelict since Soviet times have recently been restarted.  Construction of the State University station (Sakhelmtsipo Universiteti), which dates back to the Soviet era and was suspended for 22 years, was restarted in July 2015 and was completed in October 2017. In perspective, the line might continue to the east.

External links
 Metro Web-site
 Tbilisi Metro on Urbanrail.net
Metrosoyuza
 Metroworld

References

Tbilisi Metro
Railway lines opened in 1979